At the Villa Rose is a 1920 British silent detective film based on the 1910 novel At the Villa Rose by British politician and author A.E.W. Mason (considered his most famous mystery). The feature was directed by Maurice Elvey and stars Manora Thew and Langhorn Burton. A print of the film survives at the British Film Institute archives.

The novel, which introduced the fictional character of French Police Inspector Hanaud, was so popular, it was filmed four times, the 1920 silent film being the first. The other three film versions were sound versions, two appearing in 1930, and the last in 1940. Although the film is mainly a murder mystery, there are some horror-oriented moments such as a creepy seance scene and a somewhat violent strangulation scene in it as well.

Plot
Inspector Hanaud is asked to investigate a murder in which a young female spiritualist is accused of murdering her wealthy employer in a Riviera mansion and then running away. She is innocent, but the villain is able to make her seem guilty. Hanaud uncovers the truth, that the murder was the result of a jewel robbery gone wrong.

Cast
Eva Westlake -  Madame Dauvray  
J.L. Boston - Besnard 
Joan Beverley - Adele Rossignol  
Kate Gurney - Helene  
Manora Thew - Celia Harland  
Teddy Arundell - Inspector Hanaud  
Norman Page - Julius Ricardo  
Armand Lenders - Perichet  
Langhorn Burton - Harry Weathermill

Critical reception
Allmovie wrote, "British novelist A.E.W. Mason is best known for his jingoistic adventure story The Four Feathers. At the Villa Rose is a lesser but no less florid Mason work. Manora Thew stars as a phony medium, working the suckers in Monaco."

References

External links

At the Villa Rose at BFI Screenonline

1920 films
1920 mystery films
British detective films
British silent feature films
Films based on British novels
Films directed by Maurice Elvey
British black-and-white films
British mystery films
1920s British films
Silent mystery films
Silent thriller films